Vinnytsia International Airport  was an airport located near the village of Havryshivka, serving the city of Vinnytsia in the Vinnytsia region of Ukraine. 

The airport was home to the 456th Guards Transport Aviation Brigade of the Ukrainian Air Force.

2022 missile strike

The airport was damaged on 6 March 2022 when it was hit by eight Kh-101 cruise missiles launched from the territory of the Black Sea during the 2022 Russian invasion of Ukraine.

Airlines and destinations

As of July 2020, there were no regular-scheduled services at the airport. It was used for irregular charter operations to destinations in Mediterranean, such as Montenegro, Egypt and Turkey. Around Rosh Hashanah, there were irregular charter flights to Ben Gurion Airport in Tel Aviv, Israel.

Statistics

Nearest airports
The nearest airports are located in Vinnytsia and in Bar, Ukraine. One of the main radars used to support the Vinnytsia International Airport operations is situated in Bar.

See also
 List of airports in Ukraine
 List of the busiest airports in Ukraine
 List of the busiest airports in Europe
 List of the busiest airports in the former USSR
 Transportation in Ukraine

References

External links
 Official website

Defunct airports in Ukraine
Airports built in the Soviet Union
Buildings and structures in Vinnytsia
Airports established in 1983
Airports disestablished in 2022
1983 establishments in Ukraine
2022 disestablishments in Ukraine
Buildings and structures destroyed during the 2022 Russian invasion of Ukraine